Ed Solo (born Ed Bickley) is a British disc jockey and record producer of electronic dance music. He has worked with artists including Blak Twang, Deekline, MC Det, Fatboy Slim, Roots Manuva, Shy FX, DJ Swift, DJ Trace and Elisabeth Troy.

Career
Solo's first releases were "125th Street" and "The Danger", co-produced with label boss Dave. Solo and Stone went under the name Click and Cycle.

In 1997, he moved to Brighton and set up a studio with Stone. Solo started working with DJ Brockie and the pair made "Reprasent", Undiluted's first release, which reached number one on all the drum-and-bass charts. Brockie and Solo continued to make more songs, including "Turntable 1", "Echo Box" (on the True Playaz label) and "System Check".

Solo became involved in the nu skool breaks in 2005; his studio was located above Krafty Kuts's old record shop. He then began working with Krafty Kuts and later the pair began co-producing music together on Krafty Kut's album Freakshow (2006). Within Nu Skool Breaks, Solo has also collaborated with musicians including Deekline, Darrison, Skool of Thought, as well as mixing down tunes for breakbeat artists including Freq Nasty and Splitloop.

Between 2008 and 2010, Solo had been making dubstep music such as the anthemic "Age of Dub", which was released on Sludge, a label he established with Deekline. Throughout the 2010s he released Jungle music with Deekline on their label Jungle Cakes.

He is also involved in a project, BattleJam, with British DMC champ 2007 "JFB" and UK beatbox champ "Beardyman" which involves live beatbox, sampling, looping, video scratching as well as crowd-sampling interaction.

References

External links
 Ed Solo on Discogs
 Ed Solo on Myspace
 

Year of birth missing (living people)
Place of birth missing (living people)
20th-century births
British beatboxers
English DJs
English record producers
English drum and bass musicians
Dubstep musicians
Living people
Musicians from Brighton and Hove
DJs from Brighton and Hove
People from Brighton
Electronic dance music DJs